The 1933 Ladies Open Championships was held at the Queen's Club, West Kensington in London from 27 March - 1 April 1933. Susan Noel won her second consecutive title defeating Sheila Keith-Jones in the final. The Championship was held later than usual because the leading players were involved in a tournament in the United States.

Draw and results

First round

Second round

Quarter finals

Semi finals

Final

Notes
+ Lady Aberdare also known as Mrs Margaret Bruce

References

Women's British Open Squash Championships
Women's British Open Squash Championships
Women's British Open Squash Championships
Women's British Open Squash Championships
Women's British Open Squash Championships
Squash competitions in London
British Open Championships